Tura Law College is an Indian undergraduate law college affiliated to the North Eastern Hill University. The college is situated in Tura, in the State of Meghalaya. This college has gained the approval of Bar Council of India (BCI), New Delhi. It offers three years undergraduate course (LL.B. or Bachelor of Law) in legal education.

History
Tura Law College was established in 1975. This college is among the renowned institutes of legal Education in the state.

References

Universities and colleges in Meghalaya
Colleges affiliated to North-Eastern Hill University
Educational institutions established in 1975
1975 establishments in Meghalaya
Tura, Meghalaya